Philip E. Strahan is an American economist, currently the John L. Collins, S. J., Chair in Finance at Carroll School of Management, Boston College.

References

Year of birth missing (living people)
Living people
Boston College faculty
American economists
University of Chicago alumni